The men's road race at the 1951 UCI Road World Championships was the 18th edition of the event. The race took place on Sunday 2 September 1951 in Varese, Italy. The race was won by Ferdinand Kübler of Switzerland.

Final classification

References

Men's Road Race
UCI Road World Championships – Men's road race